The Pacific Wrestling Federation (PWF) World Tag Team Championship was a professional wrestling tag team championship in All Japan Pro Wrestling, created in 1984. It was unified with the NWA International Tag Team Championship in 1988, to create the World Tag Team Championship, or Double Cup.

Title history
Key

See also
 All Japan Pro Wrestling
 NWA International Tag Team Championship
 World Tag Team Championship

Footnotes

References

External links
 PWF World Tag Team Title History

All Japan Pro Wrestling championships
Tag team wrestling championships